Erlingen is a small village and also an Ortsteil of the municipality Meitingen. The village belongs to the administrative district Augsburg in Bavaria, southern Germany. It is located between the cities Augsburg and Donauwörth. Until 1 July 1972, when the village was integrated into the municipality Meitingen, Erlingen was independent. Today the population in Erlingen is about 1400 people. Erlingen belongs to the Roman Catholic parish of Saint Clemens in Herbertshofen.

References 

Villages in Bavaria
Augsburg (district)